Loud most commonly refers to:
 Loudness, the subjective quality of sound of great intensity

Loud may also refer to:

Music

Albums
 Loud (Half Japanese album), 1981
 Loud (Rihanna album), 2010
 Loud (Timo Maas album), 2001
 Loud (Wicked Tinkers album), 1999
 Loud, a 2000 album by Lexy & K-Paul
Loud (EP), by American Pop-Rock band R5
 Loud, a 2018 album by Marwa Loud

Songs
 "Loud" (Mac Miller song), 2012
 "Loud" (Shannon Noll song), 2007
 "Loud" (Stan Walker song), 2011
 "Loud" (R5 song), 2013
 "Loud" (Tim Hicks song), 2018
 "Loud", a song by Silk City, featuring GoldLink and Desiigner
 "Loud", a 2007 single by Big & Rich from the album Between Raising Hell and Amazing Grace
 "Loud", a song by Chocolate USA from the 1992 album All Jets Are Gonna Fall Today
 "Loud", a song by Kutless from the 2008 album To Know That You're Alive
 "Loud", a 2006 single by Masters at Work with Beto Cuevas
 "Loud", a song by Matt Nathanson from the 1999 album Still Waiting for Spring
 "Loud", an additional song by Paulina Rubio included on some reissues of the album Brava!
 "Loud", a song by Reks from his 2016 album The Greatest X
 "LOUD", a song by Sammy Hagar from the 2008 album Cosmic Universal Fashion
 "Loud", a collaboration by several artists appearing on the 2012 album The Gates Mixed Plate by Tech N9ne

Other music
 Loud Tour (R5), a 2013 concert tour by R5 to promote their EP Loud
 Loud Tour, a 2011 concert tour by Rihanna in support of the album Loud
 Loud Records, a subsidiary of SRC Records founded in 1992
 Loud (band), a British 1990s band
 Loudness (band), a Japanese rock band
 Loud (electronic music act), an Israeli psytrance music group
 Loud (rapper), a Canadian rapper from Quebec

Television
 Loud (TV series), a Canadian television show
 The Loud House, an American animated television series
 Lincoln Loud, the protagonist of The Loud House
 Loud Kiddington, a character from the animated television show Histeria!
 Loud (South Korean TV series), a South Korean survival reality show

Other uses
 Loud (surname), an uncommon surname
 Loud Brothers, a defunct American piano manufacturer
 Loud Mine, a gold mine in White County, Georgia
 LOUD Technologies, an American audio equipment manufacturer
 Loud Township, Michigan, U.S.
 River Loud, a river in Lancashire, England
 Loud (esports), a Brazilian esports organisation

See also
Louder (disambiguation)